Michael Joseph Bielecki  (born July 31, 1959) is a former professional baseball player who pitched in the Major Leagues for five different teams.

Major league career

Pittsburgh Pirates
After graduating from Dundalk High School, Bielecki attended Loyola College in Maryland for the 1977 –78 academic year. He pitched for the Greyhounds for only one season due to the university discontinuing its intercollegiate baseball program in the autumn of 1978. Bielecki was drafted by the Pittsburgh Pirates in the first round, with the eighth pick of the 1979 amateur draft (secondary phase). He made his debut on September 14, 1984. Bielecki spent the next four seasons with the Pirates, only playing full-time in 1986, finishing that season with a 6–11 record and a 4.66 ERA.

Chicago Cubs
In 1989, Bielecki won a career high 18 games for the Cubs and finished ninth in Cy Young Award voting. He was nicknamed "BOOM BOOM" Bielecki by Steve Stone for the two-run single he collected against the Pittsburgh Pirates in a game on April 13, 1991. Bielecki pitched the first night game ever at Wrigley Field, on August 9, 1988.

Cleveland Indians
In 1993, as an Indian, Bielecki had been invited to join Steve Olin, Tim Crews and Bob Ojeda on a fishing boat in spring training, but declined. The subsequent crash of the boat killed Olin and Crews, and nearly killed Ojeda. Bielecki didn't stay long in Cleveland; he ended the season pitching for the Baltimore Orioles AAA farm team.

California Angels
In 1995 Bielecki pitched for the California Angels, and had a 5.97 ERA in 22 appearances with the team.

Atlanta Braves
In 1991 Bielecki was acquired by the Braves along with Damon Berryhill. With only two days left in the season, in 1992 he was named the fifth starter for the Braves but his season ended in August due to an elbow injury. In 1994 he returned to the Braves. Appeared in the 1996 World Series as a member of the Braves. His final game was on August 16, 1997.

References

External links
, or Pura Pelota (Venezuelan Winter League)

1959 births
Living people
Baseball players from Baltimore
American expatriate baseball players in Canada
Águilas del Zulia players
Atlanta Braves players
Buffalo Bisons (minor league) players
California Angels players
Chicago Cubs players
Cleveland Indians players
Greenwood Pirates players
Gulf Coast Pirates players
Hawaii Islanders players
Iowa Cubs players
Lake Elsinore Storm players
Lynn Pirates (1983) players
Major League Baseball pitchers
Navegantes del Magallanes players
American expatriate baseball players in Venezuela
Pittsburgh Pirates players
Shelby Pirates players
Rochester Red Wings players
Valencia Matadors baseball players
Vancouver Canadians players